Latiremidae is a family of crustaceans belonging to the order Harpacticoida.

Genera:
 Arbutifera Huys & Kunz, 1988
 Delamarella Chappuis, 1954

References

Harpacticoida